is an asteroid, classified as near-Earth object of the Amor group. It was discovered on 6 March 2003, by astronomers of the LONEOS program at Anderson Mesa Station near Flagstaff, Arizona, in the United States. Peter Jenniskens (2003–2004) proposed that it is the parent body of the Quadrantid meteor shower.  is likely an extinct comet and may even be related to the comet C/1490 Y1.  came to perihelion on 12 March 2014.

Notes 
†Assuming an albedo between 0.04 (typical of extinct comet nuclei) and 0.09.

References

External links 
 Quadrantid Parent Discovered (Leonid Daily News: 8 December 2003)
 
 
 

196256
196256
196256
196256
20030306